Kétújfalu is a village in Baranya county, Hungary. 

Populated places in Baranya County